Dereli is a town and district of Giresun Province, Turkey.

Dereli (Turkic: "of/with creeks") may also refer to:

People
 Abdurrahman Dereli (born 1981), Turkish footballer
 Emel Dereli (born 1996), Turkish female shot putter
 Selçuk Dereli (born 1969), Turkish football referee
 Tekin Dereli (born 1949), Turkish theoretical physicist

Places
 Dərəli, a village in the Zangilan Rayon of Azerbaijan
 Dereli, Beypazarı, a village in the district of Beypazarı, Ankara Province, Turkey
 Dereli, Çine, a village in the district of Çine, Aydın Province, Turkey
 Dereli, Döşemealtı, a village in the district of Antalya, Antalya Province, Turkey 
 Dereli, Gercüş, a village in the district of Gercüş, Batman Province, Turkey
 Dereli, Gölpazarı, a village in the district of Gölpazarı, Bilecik Province, Turkey
 Dereli, Ulus, a village in the district of Ulus, Bartın Province, Turkey

Turkish-language surnames